Stigmella mespilicola is a moth of the family Nepticulidae. It is found from Germany to the Iberian Peninsula, Italy and Macedonia and from Great Britain to Ukraine.

The larvae feed on Amelachier parviflora, Cotoneaster racemiflorus, Cotoneaster salicifolia, Sorbus aria and Sorbus torminalis. They mine the leaves of their host plant. The mine consists of a short, full depth, gradually widening corridor. The last section has the form of an elongated blotch. Pupation takes place outside of the mine.

External links
bladmineerders.nl
Fauna Europaea

Nepticulidae
Moths of Europe
Moths described in 1856